G. H. Mumm & Cie is a Champagne house founded in 1827 and based in Reims, France. G.H. Mumm is one of the largest Champagne houses and is currently ranked 4th globally based on number of bottles sold. The company is owned by Pernod Ricard. 

G.H. Mumm was the official sponsor of F1 racing from 2000 until 2015 and provided the champagne bottles for the podium celebrations after each race. 

G.H. Mumm Cordon Rouge is also the official champagne of the Kentucky Derby and the Melbourne Cup.

History 

It was founded by three brothers: Jacobus, Gottlieb and Phillip Mumm, German winemakers from the Rhine valley, along with G. Heuser and Friedrich Giesler on March 1, 1827, as P. A. Mumm Giesler et C°. P.A. were the initials of the Mumms' father, Peter Arnold Mumm, a successful wine merchant from Solingen. Mumm's label is famous for its red ribbon (Cordon Rouge), patterned after and resembling the red sash of the Grand Cross (Grand-croix)—formerly called Grand Ribbon (Grand cordon)—the highest level of the French Legion of Honour.

The French confiscated all of the Mumm's property, although they had lived in Champagne for almost a century before World War I, because they had never become French citizens.

Sponsorships
G.H. Mumm was the official sponsor of F1 racing from 2000 until 2015 and provided the champagne bottles for the podium celebrations after each race. Now, they are the official sponsor of Formula E. G.H. Mumm Cordon Rouge is also the official champagne of the Kentucky Derby and Australia's Melbourne Cup, two major horse races. In October 2016, it was announced that G.H. Mumm would replace J&B after 39 years as the headline sponsor of South Africa's major horse race event, The Sun Met.

In November 2016, G.H. Mumm announced the appointment of eight-time Olympic gold medallist sprinter Usain Bolt as its "CEO" (Chief Entertainment Officer) to feature in a multi-media promotional campaign.

G.H. Mumm also played a central role in Thomas Coville's celebration after achieving his new world record of 49 days and 3 hours for yacht solo-navigation around the world on Christmas Day 2016.

Mumm Napa

Mumm Napa is one of California's traditional method sparkling wine producers, a joint venture between the G.H. Mumm & Cie and Joseph E Seagram & Sons. The location in Napa Valley was founded by Guy Deveaux, who determined Napa's long hot days and cold nights to be ideal for producing the right amount of acidity and ripeness.

Foujita chapel

In 1964, René Lalou, the head of the Mumm Champagne House, and Léonard Foujita (1886–1968), a Japanese painter belonging to the Ecole de Paris school of art, decided to build a chapel in the gardens belonging to the Champagne house. Begun in 1965, the Foujita chapel was entirely designed by Foujita in the romanesque style, who drew the plans and designed the ironwork, stained glass and sculptures. He supervised the building and interior decoration.
The chapel is decorated with frescos inspired by oriental art. The chapel was consecrated on 1 October 1966 and handed over to the City of Reims on 18 October 1966. The chapel was designated an historic monument in 1992.

Foujita also gave G.H. Mumm a fresco depicting The Virgin in the Vines. The rose featured in the painting became the cuvée's emblem and appears on the metallic cap on top of the cork of the rose Champagne.

See also
 List of Champagne houses

References

Further reading
 Prial, Frank J. Decantations. NY: St. Martin's Press, 2001.

External links

 Mumm official site
 Mumm Napa official site

Champagne producers
Pernod Ricard brands
Food and drink companies established in 1827
Purveyors to the Imperial and Royal Court
French companies established in 1827